is a Japanese football player who plays for FC Machida Zelvia.

Playing career
Nakashima was born in Takaoka on June 16, 1984. After graduating from high school, he joined J1 League club Kashima Antlers in 2003. He got opportunities to play as substitute forward from first season. In 2006, he moved to J2 League club Vegalta Sendai. He played many matches as substitute forward in 2006 and became a regular forward in 2007. Vegalta won the champions in 2009 season and was promoted to J1. However his opportunity to play decreased from 2010 season. In 2012, he moved to J2 club Montedio Yamagata and became a regular forward soon. Montedio was promoted to J1 end of 2014 season. Montedio also won the 2nd place in 2014 Emperor's Cup. In 2016, he moved to J2 club FC Machida Zelvia.

Club statistics

References

External links

Profile at FC Machida Zelvia

1984 births
Living people
Association football people from Toyama Prefecture
Japanese footballers
J1 League players
J2 League players
Kashima Antlers players
Vegalta Sendai players
Montedio Yamagata players
FC Machida Zelvia players
Association football forwards